The Bock is a promontory in the north-eastern corner of Luxembourg City's old historical district. Offering a natural fortification, its rocky cliffs tower above the River Alzette, which surrounds it on three sides. It was here that Count Siegfried built his Castle of Lucilinburhuc in 963, providing a basis for the development of the town that became Luxembourg. Over the centuries, the Bock and the surrounding defenses were reinforced, attacked, and rebuilt time and time again as the armies of the Burgundians, Habsburgs, Spaniards, Prussians, and French vied for victory over one of Europe's most strategic strongholds, the Fortress of Luxembourg. Warring did not stop until the Treaty of London was signed in 1867, calling for the demolition of the fortifications. Ruins of the old castle and the vast underground system of passages and galleries known as the casemates continue to be a major tourist attraction.

History

    
It was in 963 that Count Siegfried, in search of a site from which he could defend his properties, obtained the Bock and its surroundings from St Maximin's Abbey in Trier in exchange for the land he owned at Feulen in the Ardennes to the north. The Romans, then the Franks, had probably already inhabited the Bock although there is only scant archeological evidence of their presence. There are however traces of a 4th-century Roman watchtower close to the point in the Fish Market where two major Roman roads used to cross, one from Reims to Trier and the other from Metz to Liège.

The first historical mention of the Bock is indeed in connection with a watchtower or fortification on the Roman road from Reims to Trier  which, in 723, was ceded by Charles Martel, Duke of the Franks, to the Abbey of St Maximin in Trier. Two centuries later, Count Siegfried, who had properties "in Feulen, Hosingen and Monnerich in the Pagus Wabrensis, in Sarreburg, Berncastel and Roussy in the Pagus Mosellanus", was looking for a location for a castle able to withstand any onslaught which would serve as a central point for his holdings. After failing to obtain a site near the Abbey of Stavelot, now in the Belgian province of Liège, he approached the Abbot of St Maximin's for the purchase of the property high up on the Bock cliff above the Alzette River, described as a "castle by name Lucilinburhuc" (castellum quod dicitur Lucilinburhuc). It therefore seems as if there was already a castle on the site before Siegfried became interested in it and that it was not Siegfried who called it Lucilinburhuc. After the consent of Emperor Otto I had been obtained, the deed was signed by Viker, Abbot of St Maximin's, on 7 April 963. Siegfried acquired the site in exchange for some of his properties at Feulen.

Over the centuries, Siegfried's fortified castle on the Bock was considerably enlarged and protected with additional walls and defences. In 987, the castle chapel was built at the nearby Fish Market. Today's St Michael's Church stands on the same site.  Under Conrad I, the castle became the residence of the Counts of Luxembourg. It was damaged, destroyed, captured and rebuilt on several occasions as the Burgundians (1473), the Habsburgs (1477), and the Spaniards (1555) attacked and took the fortress.

As time passed, the fortifications needed to be adapted to new methods of war based on increasingly strong firepower. During the 1640s under the Spaniards, the Swiss engineer Isaac von Treybach significantly reworked the defences. The Bock was also strengthened with three forts, the Large Bock, Middle Bock and Small Bock (from west to east), separated from each other by cuts in the rock and linked by bridges. As a result, little remained of the medieval castle.

A little later in 1684, on behalf of Louis XIV, Vauban succeeded in capturing the city of Luxembourg during a month-long siege under which the Bock fortifications were completely flattened. Thereafter Vauban, perhaps the most competent fortification engineer of his day, undertook major additions to the defences, realizing that underground passages and chambers were just as important as the surface installations. The Large Bock, connected to the old town by the Pont du Château, was further reinforced. Enclosed by a wall 12 m (39 ft) high, it was the major component of the new fortress.

In addition to these structures, the Bock also included a system of casemates, which originated in the cellars of the medieval castle. In 1744, during the Austrian period, these underground passages were considerably enlarged by General Neipperg. The main passage, which still remains, is 110 m long and up to 7 m wide. Branches leading off on either side were equipped with no less than 25 cannon slots, 12 to the north and 13 to the south, offering considerable firepower. In the event of war, the Bock casemates, covering an area of 1,100 m2, could be used as barracks for several hundred soldiers. Water was supplied from a well 47 m deep.

Thanks to its defenses, in 1794 during the French Revolutionary Wars, the city held out against a French siege for seven months. When the garrison finally surrendered, the walls were still unbreached. This led the French politician and engineer Lazare Carnot to call the Luxembourg fortress "the best in the world, apart from Gibraltar". As a result, it has often been called the Gibraltar of the North.

The fortifications were finally demolished under the terms of the Treaty of London in 1867. The demolition took 16 years and cost the enormous sum of 1.5 million gold francs.

Pont du château

The two-storey bridge connecting the Bock to the old town was an important component of the fortifications. Technically, it is a rather curious structure. Built in 1735 by the Austrians, it provides no less than four ways of crossing between the cliffs: the road over the top, a passage by way of the four upper arches, a spiral staircase up through the main arch, and a tunnel under the road at the bottom.

Famous visitors

Over the years, the Bock casemates have received several famous visitors. These include:
Emperor Joseph II of Austria (1781);
Napoleon Bonaparte (1804);
Prince Henry of the Netherlands (1868);
Grand Duchess Charlotte of Luxembourg (1936);
Grand Duke Henri of Luxembourg and his wife Grand Duchess Maria Teresa (2000).

The legend of Melusina
There have reportedly been people that have seen Melusine in the waters nearby.

See also
Luxembourg City
History of Luxembourg

Gallery

References

History of Luxembourg City
Military history of Luxembourg
Fortifications in Luxembourg
Geography of Luxembourg
Tourist attractions in Luxembourg City

nl:Kazematten (Luxemburg)